Brusett is an unincorporated tiny rural hamlet in northwestern Garfield County, Montana, United States.  It lies about the intersection of Brusett Road and Edwards Road, local roads west of the town of Jordan, the county seat of Garfield County.  Its elevation is 2,904 feet (885 m).  It has a post office, serving the ZIP code of 59318, and a small school house; and no other businesses or services.

History
The post office opened on May 29, 1916. The town was named for its first postmaster, Alma Brusett Smith.

Climate
According to the Köppen Climate Classification system, Brusett has a semi-arid climate, abbreviated "BSk" on climate maps.

References

Unincorporated communities in Garfield County, Montana
Unincorporated communities in Montana